Warren Creek is a stream in the U.S. state of South Dakota.

Warren Creek has the name of a pioneer trapper.

See also
List of rivers of South Dakota

References

Rivers of Butte County, South Dakota
Rivers of South Dakota